DRR may refer to:

Deficit round robin
Digitally Reconstructed Radiograph; see also Beam's eye view
Disaster Response Route, emergency response road network in British Columbia, Canada
Disaster Risk Reduction
Disneyland Railroad, steam railroad attraction in Anaheim, California
Directorate of Rice Research
Dolly Rockit Rollers, roller derby league from Leicestershire, England
Domain-Range ratio, abstract term in computer science
Dreyer & Reinbold Racing, an American auto racing team

See also
 DRRS (disambiguation)